Interface, Inc. is a global manufacturer of commercial flooring with an integrated collection of carpet tiles and resilient flooring, including luxury vinyl tiles (LVT) and nora brand rubber flooring.

Company information
Interface, Inc. and its subsidiaries sells modular carpet tiles, luxury vinyl tile and Nora brand rubber flooring.

Its founder, Ray Anderson, was featured in the documentary film The Corporation discussing environmental sustainability in modern business. Interface was founded in 1973 by Ray Anderson, whose decade and a half in the carpet trade had led him to create one of the first U.S. manufacturers of carpet tiles, also known as modular carpet or carpet squares. Carpet tiles, which originated in Europe, became highly popular during the 1980s as an alternative to broadloom carpet, especially in office environments that at the time were switching to flexible, “open” plans that required easy access to wiring and infrastructure beneath floors. Interface grew to become the largest carpet-tile maker on the planet.

Then, starting in 1994, Interface focused on environmental sustainability, especially in reducing the use of petroleum. At this time, the company announced a program called Mission Zero with a goal of eliminating any negative impact the company may have on the environment by 2020. Since 1996, Interface chose to adopt an innovation-based green strategy. In a short period, it managed to reduce its impact on the environment by one third. Each year, the company releases its annual EcoMetrics, demonstrating the company’s environmental impact and progress.

In 2016, Interface announced its new mission, Climate Take Back, which aimed to reverse global warming. In 2018, Interface announced that all of its products, including all carpet tile and luxury vinyl tile (LVT), are carbon neutral across the entire product lifecycle through its Carbon Neutral Floors program. in 2019, 90% of Interface’s energy came from renewables.

Interface was recognized as Recyclers of the Year by the Carpet America Recovery Effort (CARE). In 2006 and 2016, Interface was voted number one in Globescan's survey of environmentally sustainable businesses. They are also the recipient of The Queen's Award for Enterprise: Sustainable Development (Environmental Achievement) (2008). Consumer advocate Ralph Nader has heralded Ray Anderson and Interface for their sincere commitment to sustainability and protecting the planet's natural resources.

Historical
1973: Ray Anderson creates Carpets International. 
1974: Carpets International introduces GlasBac, a patented structured backing system that has become the industry standard for high-performance modular backings.
1982: Carpets International becomes Interface Flooring Systems, Inc, and acquires Compact Carpet of Canada, renaming it Interface Flooring Systems Canada, Inc.
1994: Ray Anderson experiences "spear in the chest” epiphany, leading Interface to establish Mission Zero.
1994: Ray Anderson reads Paul Hawken's book The Ecology of Commerce, inspiring his first environmental speech; develops framework to track and measure sustainability progress, classified as Mount Sustainability.
1995: Interface establishes ReEntry Recycling Program, which reclaims carpet to ensure used flooring tiles do not end up in landfills.
1996: Interface partners with yarn suppliers to develop recycled nylon.
1998: The company introduces NexStep polyurethane cushion backing. 
2001: Interface establishes new backing system, GlasBacRE, now featuring up to 81% total recycled content.
2003: Interface launches first residential product through FLOR.
2003: Interface becomes the first carpet company to receive Environmentally Preferable Product (EPP) certification for its products and the first company to introduce Climate Neutral product offering through its Cool Carpet program.
2006: Interface unveils TacTiles, the first glue-free and sustainable flooring installation method.
2008: Interface is first to pilot Environmental Product Declarations (EPDs).
2010: Interface develops first product with 100% recycled nylon with yarn supplier Aquafil.
2012: Interface announces Net-Works in partnership with the Zoological Society of London to collect discarded fishing nets for recycling into new yarn.
2015: Interface introduces Skinny Planks, 25 x 100 cm carpet planks that can be used to create similar patterns to those found on timber or vinyl flooring.
2016: Interface launches new mission, Climate Take Back, which aims to reverse global warming.
2017: Interface announces entry into the hard surface flooring category with a line of luxury vinyl tile (LVT).
2017: Interface announces Proof Positive, a first-of-its-kind, carbon negative carpet tile prototype.
2018: Interface develops first carbon negative carpet tile backing, CircuitBac Green, to further reduce flooring’s carbon footprint.
2018: Interface acquires Nora Systems.
2019: Interface declares its entire portfolio carbon neutral across the entire product lifecycle through its Carbon Neutral Floors program.
2019: Interface celebrates Mission Zero success and continues to activate on Climate Take Back; releases 25th Sustainability Report, highlighting lessons learned and key EcoMetrics.

References

External links
InterfaceGlobal
FLOR - Interface's residential brand site
Interface Inc's sustainability website
InterfaceFLOR Europe corporate website
Industry Leader Shares Vision for the Greening of Corporate America
Interface Investor Relations

Manufacturing companies based in Atlanta
Companies listed on the Nasdaq
Textile companies of the United States